Reginald Etoy Branch (born October 22, 1962) is a former American football running back in the National Football League for the Washington Redskins.  He played college football at West Virginia State University and East Carolina University.

Early years
Reggie attended Seminole High School in Sanford, Florida. He was Coached by Jesse "celltech", and Emory Blake, former NFL player and NFL quarterback Jeff Blake's father.

College career
Reggie began his college career at West Virginia State, where he played only one season. He then transferred to East Carolina University in the spring of 1981 and was given a redshirt and placed on the practice team. In the spring of 1982, he was moved over to fullback and was the backup to Earnest Byner. Reggie's uncle, Tony Collins, was also an ECU running back, along with eventual Washington Redskins teammate Earnest Byner.

Life After Football
Branch worked at the  Starboard Restaurant and Bar, located in Dewey Beach, Delaware.

References

1962 births
Living people
Players of American football from Florida
Sportspeople from Sanford, Florida
Seminole High School (Seminole County, Florida) alumni
American football running backs
East Carolina Pirates football players
West Virginia State Yellow Jackets football players
Washington Redskins players